Nuestra Belleza Tamaulipas 2012 was held at the Teatro de la Reforma of Matamoros, Tamaulipas on July 12, 2012. At the conclusion of the final night of competition Andrea Andrade from Reynosa was crowned the winner. Andrade was crowned by outgoing Nuestra Belleza Tamaulipas titleholder Karen Lizcano. Seven contestants competed for the title.

Results

Placements

Background Music
Polo Rojas

Contestants

References

External links
Official Website

Tamaulipas